Kari Grandi is a fictional character, the main protagonist in the Finnish television advertisements for Grandi, a brand of ready-to-drink juice.

Grandi was played by Eeki Mantere from the beginning of the character in the 1970s until 1999. He was then replaced by actor Sami Kojonen.

The advertisements are parodies of typical 1920s-era adventure movies where a group of villains kidnap a woman and torture her by withholding water and other drinks from her. Somewhere at a distance, Kari Grandi hears her cries for help and rushes to her aid. First he drinks a carton of Grandi juice, then he drops the empty carton on the ground and steps on it. The ensuing sonic boom knocks out the villains, and Kari Grandi is able to revive the woman by giving her a carton of Grandi juice.

The narration of the advertisements always ends with an established catchphrase:
Hän on kaikkien janoisten sankari, aikamme legenda: Kari... Grandi!
In English:
He is the hero of all who are thirsty, the legend of our time: Kari... Grandi!

The character's name is an obvious homage to the actor Cary Grant. The character Kari Grandi was himself parodied in the Finnish sci-fi movie Star Wreck: In the Pirkinning, in the form of Babel 13 security officer Mihail Karigrandi (English name: Mikhail Garybrandy), who is a parody of the Babylon 5 character Michael Garibaldi.

Television in Finland
Male characters in animation
Drink advertising characters